Haramaya University (HU) (Oromo: Univarsiitii Haramayaa) is a public research university in Haramaya, Oromia Region, Ethiopia. The Ministry of Science and Higher Education admits qualified students to Haramaya University based on their score on the Ethiopian Higher Education Entrance Examination (EHEEE).

History
Haramaya University as "Haramaya University College of Agricultural and Environmental Sciences" was established in 1954 and it was part of Addis Ababa University until 1985 when it upgraded full-fledged university of agriculture. The university converted to multi-disciplinary university in 1996. The university named as "Haramaya University" in 2006.

On 27 May 1985, marking the historic visit of President Mengistu Haile Mariam to campus, the college transformed  into University of Agriculture. By 1995/1996, the university underwent new transformation phase involving fields of Teacher Education and Health. In September 2002, two more facilities were opened: Faculty of Law and Faculty of Business and Economics.

The college offered BSc and MSc degrees in animal and range sciences; plant science; rural development and agricultural extension; natural resources and environmental sciences; and agricultural economics and agri-business. 20 MSc and 12 PhD programs can be obtained from these disciplines. The university gives two and half year BSc programs for mid-career professionals who hold diploma in agriculture and forestry. The university operates its research and extensive activities under umbrella term of Ethiopian Institution of Agricultural Research.

Notable faculty
 Mitiku Haile
 Girma Yohannes Iyasu

Notable alumni
 Gebisa Ejeta, plant breeder, geneticist and professor 
 Siraj Fegessa, former Ethiopia Minister of Transportation and former Ethiopia Minister of Defense
 Muferiat Kamil, Ethiopia Minister of Peace
 Fetien Abay, professor of crop science at Mekelle University
 Makonnen Kebret, agricultural educationalist
 Gedu Andargachew

References

External links

Haramaya University website
Haramaya Institute of Technology website

Dire Dawa
Educational institutions established in 1954
1954 establishments in Ethiopia
Agricultural universities and colleges
Universities and colleges in Oromia Region